Rajendra Sadashiv Nikalje (born 13 January 1959), popularly known by his moniker Chhota Rajan, is an Indian gangster who served as the boss of a major crime syndicate based in Mumbai.

While living in Tilak Nagar, a big colony for the low-income group near Chembur, Mumbai, Rajan started as a petty black marketeer of cinema tickets at Sahakar Cinema. He was imprisoned for assaulting police constables. After being released from jail, he joined the Bada Rajan gang in 1982. After Bada Rajan was shot dead, Chhota Rajan took over the gang and worked for Dawood Ibrahim who had fled to Dubai.

During the Arun Gawli – Dawood gang war in the late eighties, Rajan escaped to Dubai in 1989 and eventually rose to be the right hand of Dawood Ibrahim before splitting with him in 1993 and forming an independent gang that frequently clashed with Dawood's D-Company. He is wanted for many criminal cases that include extortion, murder, smuggling and drug trafficking. He is also wanted in 70 murder cases and several more attempted murders. It is said that Rajan finances a social organization called "Sahyadri Krida Mandal" that organizes the Ganesh Utsav in Tilaknagar, which has been Rajan's home base. Rajan's wife and two daughters continue to live in Tilaknagar.

Rajan was arrested in Bali by Indonesian police on 25 October 2015.

Rajan was extradited from Bali to India on 6 November 2015 after 27 years on the run and is currently awaiting trials for ongoing cases in custody. On 2 May 2018 he was convicted of murder of a journalist and handed life imprisonment.

Criminal career

Chhota Rajan was born in a Dalit family in the Tilaknagar area of Chembur, Bombay. He worked as a cinema ticket seller in his early days. He started his criminal career by committing petty crimes in Chembur. His mentor Bada Rajan introduced him to black marketing of cinema tickets at Sahakar cinema Ashok Theatre in the 1980s.

His mentors were Bada Rajan and Yadagiri of Hyderabad under whom he learned the tricks of the trade. Once Bada Rajan was killed, Nikalje received the throne and the title—Chhota Rajan. For a short period, Dawood Ibrahim, Rajan and Arun Gawli worked together. Then, Gawli's elder brother Papa Gawli was assassinated over a drug deal and a rift formed. Rajan went to Dubai — his family is still here, apart from his wife in 1989 to attend the wedding of Noora, Ibrahim's brother. He never returned. After the 1993 Bombay bombings, Ibrahim and Rajan fell out. There were even reports that he tipped off the Research and Analysis Wing about Ibrahim's network. The Ibrahim-Rajan party was over, the messy end coming in September 2000, with Chhota Shakeel's attack on Rajan in his Bangkok hotel room.

On 26 October 2015, Rajan was arrested in Bali. Acting on a tip-off from Australian police, Indonesian authorities detained   Rajan on Sunday as he arrived in Bali from Sydney.

CBI director Anil Sinha confirmed the arrest saying, "Bali Police arrested Chhota Rajan yesterday at CBI’s request made through Interpol."

Split with Dawood
After the split, he formed his own gang. Reports of bloody shootouts between Rajan and Dawood's hoodlums have been common since the split. In 1994, Rajan lured one of Dawood's favourite "narco-terrorist" Phillu Khan alias Bakhtiyar Ahmed Khan to a hotel room in Bangkok, where he was tortured to death, having been betrayed by his closest aide and sidekick Mangesh "Mangya" Pawar.

Both Phillu and Mangya were involved in the 1993 blasts as police had filed cases on 15 March 1993 alleging their involvement in the blasts. Till now Rajan gunmen have gunned down 10 people accused in the blast.

Assassination attempt
In September 2000, Dawood tracked down Rajan in Bangkok. Sharad, used his links with Mumbai-based hotelier Vinod and A. Mishra to track down Rajan in Bangkok, Dawood's aide Chhota Shakeel then led the hit. Posing as a pizza delivery man they gunned down the trusted Rajan hitman Rohit Varma and his wife. However their aim of killing Rajan failed, with Rajan escaping through the hotel's roof and fire-escape. He then recovered in a hospital and slipped away to evade capture.

Dawood Ibrahim confirmed the attack on the telephone to Rediff.com, saying Rajan tried to escape by jumping out of the window of the first-floor room where he was attacked. He, however, broke his back in the fall and was taken to hospital.

This failed assassination attempt proved costly for Dawood. Rajan's associates tracked down and shot dead Vinod in 2001 in Mumbai, as well as Sunil Soans – another Dawood associate. Both Vinod and Sunil had provided information to Dawood's associates of Rajan's whereabouts.

While the killings of Vinod and Sunil Soans did not significantly disrupt D-Company, on 19 January 2003, Rajan's associates then gunned down Sharad – Dawood's chief finance manager and money-laundering agent – at the India Club in Dubai. This brazen killing was emblematic of the shift of power between Dawood and Rajan. Not only was the execution in a very public setting, but it was also at a location that Dawood considered his operational backyard. Intelligence reports have suggested that Sharad's death was a crippling blow to D-Company since much financial and monetary information of the crime syndicate operations managed by Sharad was never fully recovered by Dawood.

Personal life
Rajan is married to Sujata Nikalje. The couple has three daughters; Ankita Nikalje, Nikita Nikalje and Khushi Nikalje. His younger brother Deepak Nikalje is associated with Republican Party of India of MP Ramdas Athawale.

Rajan was addressed as 'Nana' by friends and colleagues. His group was also known as Nana Company.

In Cinema
The 2002 Bollywood film, Company had a character Chandu, essayed by actor Vivek Oberoi, having some resemblances of Chhota Rajan with real-life Dawood Ibrahim gang. Also, the 1999 film Vaastav: The Reality:, starring Sanjay Dutt was loosely based on Rajan's life.

Capture
On 25 October 2015, Rajan was captured in Bali, Indonesia where Indian authorities contacted Interpol for deporting him back to India. The capture took place due to a tip-off by Australian police stating that Rajan had travelled to Bali with an Indian passport by the name Mohan Kumar. According to CBI sources, the underworld don was standing in a queue at the airport when the immigration authorities asked him to step aside and reveal his name. To this, the gangster first gave his original name Rajendra Sadashiv Nikalje, and then immediately corrected himself to say, Mohan Kumar, the name mentioned on his passport. This alerted the authorities, and they started questioning him. The authorities then started the identification process with the help of fingerprint tests. 11 out of 18 points of fingerprint samples given in the Red Corner notice matched with his samples, confirming that he was Rajendra Sadashiv Nikalje. Rajan was extradited to India on 6 November 2016 and is currently in Tihar Jail, awaiting trial in almost 70 cases.

Conviction
A special CBI Court in New Delhi on 25 April 2017 awarded seven years rigorous imprisonment to Rajan and three other accused in the fake passport case.

The Maharashtra MCOCA court found Chhota Rajan guilty of the murder of journalist J. Dey on 2 May 2018 and handed him life imprisonment.

References

1959 births
Bootleggers
Criminals from Mumbai
Crime in Thailand
Crime in the United Arab Emirates
Fugitives wanted by India
Marathi people
D-Company
Indian drug traffickers
Film producers from Mumbai
Indian money launderers
Indian gangsters
Indian smugglers
Shooting survivors
Indian crime bosses
Indian expatriates in the United Arab Emirates
Indian prisoners sentenced to life imprisonment
Living people
People convicted of murder by India
Indian people convicted of murder
Inmates of Tihar Jail
Prisoners and detainees of Maharashtra